National Fossil Day was established in the United States by the National Park Service during 2010 as a celebration and partnership to promote the scientific and educational values of fossils. The first annual National Fossil Day was hosted on October 13, 2010, as a fossil-focused day during Earth Science Week. The National Park Service, the American Geosciences Institute, and more than 385 partners, including museums, institutions, science and teacher organizations, agencies, fossil sites, amateur fossil groups and other entities, joined together in a partnership to educate the public about fossils, the science of paleontology and America's Paleontological Heritage. There are National Fossil Day partners in all 50 states providing opportunities for educational outreach and hosting hundreds of fossil-themed activities at the local level.

National Park Service senior paleontologist Vincent L. Santucci is considered the "Father of National Fossil Day" and first proposed the concept of National Fossil Day in 2009 as a nationwide celebration for fossils in the United States. Santucci reached out to Geoff Camphire and Ann Benbow at the American Geosciences Institute (AGI) seeking support to establish National Fossil Day as a dedicated day during Earth Science Week. Once the idea of National Fossil Day was approved, dozens of organizations and museums joined this partnership including the Geological Society of America, Paleontological Society, Society of Vertebrate Paleontology, Smithsonian, and American Museum of Natural History. The National Fossil Day Celebration on the National Mall in Washington, D.C., was the kickoff event hosted on October 13, 2010. The event captured widespread media and public attention throughout the U.S.

The second National Fossil Day 2011 was observed on October 12, 2011, with events at museums, parks, universities, and non-profit organizations. National Fossil Day 2012 was celebrated on October 17, 2012, with an opening event held on the National Mall in Washington, D.C. Similar events have been held annually.

Official NFD Logo 
The official National Fossil Day Logo was introduced in 2010 and is used on promotional items and event websites every year. The logo features a fossil titanothere, a prehistoric mammal.

Annual Artwork 
Each year new National Fossil Day Artwork is created and announced in mid-January on the event website, depicting a prehistoric organism:

Sponsored Art Contest 
An annual National Fossil Day Art Contest is hosted by the National Park Service and the National Fossil Day Partnership. The theme for the year is announced in the Spring and people of all ages are invited to submit fossil-inspired, original artwork. Contest rules and an entry form are available on the official National Fossil Day website. The art contest themes for past years include:

 2019 Theme: Extinct Giants and Survivors of the Last Ice Age
 2018 Theme: The Age of Reptiles–More Than Just Dinosaurs
 2017 Theme: The Future of Fossils: People Studying and Caring for Our Fossil Heritage
 2016 Theme: Your Favorite Fossil from a National Park
 2015 Theme: Postcards from the Past
 2014 Theme: Fossil Neighborhoods
 2013 Theme: Your Nomination for Our National Fossil
 2012 Theme: Careers in Paleontology
 2011 Theme: Fossils in My Backyard
 2010 Theme: Paleontology: Preserving the Past for our Future

References

External links

National Fossil Day Website
Earth Science Week Website

Fossils
Paleontology
Public holidays in the United States
Science festivals
Environmental awareness days
Recurring events established in 2010
October observances
Science events in the United States
2010 establishments in the United States
Annual events in the United States